Burgastay (Burgaastai) is a rural locality (an ulus) in Selenginsky District, Republic of Buryatia, Russia. The population was 96 as of 2010.

Geography 
Burgastay is located 38 km south of Gusinoozyorsk (the district's administrative centre) by road. Novoselenginsk is the nearest rural locality.

References 

Rural localities in Selenginsky District